Schenectady College may refer to:
 Schenectady County Community College
 Union College, sometimes called Schenectady College in older writing